Jose Mari Hontiveros Avellana (May 6, 1941 – June 26, 2011) was a Filipino actor, screenwriter, director, and production designer.

Biography 

Avellana was the son of National Artists director Lamberto V. Avellana and actress Daisy Avellana. 

While still in college, he started out as a Radio announcer for DZFM Radio before turning to the stage and to acting. His first major movie role was that of evil drug lord Ming in Cirio H. Santiago's Blaxploitation epic TNT Jackson (1974).

This marked the beginning of a decade-long professional relationship with influential producer Cirio H. Santiago, during which Avellana took on various responsibilities. In many productions, he worked simultaneously as an actor, production designer and assistant director. Some of the more notable productions in which he acted include successful action-adventure outings such as Wheels of Fire (1985), Death Force (1978) and Bloodfist II (1990). In these movies made for an international audience he was mostly playing antagonists.

Avellana also directed movies in Tagalog for the local market such as the family drama Kung Mawawala Ka Pa (1993) that won Best Picture at the 1993 Metro Manila Film Festival and the patriotic revolution tale Damong Ligaw (1997) that was awarded the FAMAS Centennial Award.

But he never gave up his love for the theater.  Until shortly before his death, he was seen on stage at the Repertory Philippines as Morrie Schwartz in a play based on Mitch Albom's book Tuesdays With Morrie and in Nick Joaquin's A Portrait of the Artist as Filipino.

Stage names 
Jose Mari Avellana also used the stage names Joe Mari Avellana and Joe Avalon.

Awards and nominations

References

External links 
 

1941 births
2011 deaths
Filipino male film actors
Filipino male stage actors
Filipino film directors